The Battle Against Berlin is a 1926 German silent film directed by Max Reichmann and starring Carlo Aldini, Jenny Jugo and Raimondo Van Riel.

The film's art direction was by Alfred Junge.

Cast

References

Bibliography

External links

1926 films
Films of the Weimar Republic
Films directed by Max Reichmann
German silent feature films
German black-and-white films
Phoebus Film films